Wang Anlong is a Chinese military officer and the current secretary of Discipline Inspection Commission of Central Theater Command Ground Force. Previously he served as deputy director of the General Office of Central Military Commission since March 2015. Wang is a member of the Communist Party of China. He holds the rank of Major general in the People's Liberation Army. He served in various posts in Nanjing Military Region before serving as director of the Political Department of 31 Army in 2014.

References

External links

People's Liberation Army generals
Living people
Politicians of the People's Republic of China
Chinese Communist Party politicians
21st-century Chinese military personnel
Year of birth missing (living people)